The 2021–22 season was Kelty Hearts' first season in the Scottish Professional Football League following their promotion from the Lowland Football League at the end of the 2020–21 season. Kelty participated in Scottish League Two and also competed in the League Cup, Challenge Cup and the Scottish Cup.

Summary  
This was Kelty Hearts' first season under the management of Kevin Thomson following the departure of Barry Ferguson, who had led the club to promotion the previous season.

Kelty entered the Scottish Cup at the second round and would eliminate then cup holders St Johnstone on their way to the fifth round before being eliminated by St Mirren.
Kelty were declared champions 26 March with a victory over Albion Rovers, which secured the league title and back to back promotions to League One.

Competitions

Results and fixtures

Scottish League Two

Scottish League Cup

Group stage
Results

Scottish Challenge Cup

Scottish Cup

Player statistics

Appearances and goals

|}

Team statistics

Competition Overview

League table

League Cup table

Transfers

Players in

Players out

Loans in

Loans out

References

Kelty
Kelty Hearts F.C.